John of Montecorvino or Giovanni da Montecorvino in Italian (1247 – 1328) was an Italian Franciscan missionary, traveller and statesman, founder of the earliest Latin Catholic missions in India and China, and archbishop of Peking. He converted many people during his missionary work and established several churches in Yuan dynasty-held Beijing. John of Montecorvino wrote a letter intending to convert the Great Khan to Catholicism. He was a contemporary of Marco Polo.

Biography
John was born at Montecorvino Rovella, in what is now Campania, Italy.

As a member of a Latin Catholic religious order which at that time was chiefly concerned with the conversion of non-Catholics, he was commissioned in 1272 by the Byzantine emperor Michael VIII Palaiologos to Pope Gregory X, to negotiate for the reunion of the 'Greek' (Orthodox) and Latin churches.

Commissioned by the Holy See to preach Christianity in the Nearer and Middle East, especially to the Asiatic hordes then threatening the West, he devoted himself incessantly from 1275 to 1286. In 1286 Arghun, the Ilkhan who ruled Persia, sent a request to the pope through the Nestorian monk, Rabban Bar Sauma, to send Catholic missionaries to the imperial court of Kublai (Emperor Shizu) of the Yuan dynasty of China, who was alleged to be well disposed toward Christianity. Pope Nicholas IV received the letter in 1287 and entrusted John with the important mission to China, where about this time Venetian lay traveller Marco Polo still remained.

Journey to Asia 
In 1289 John revisited the Papal Court and was sent out as papal legate to the Great Khan, the Ilkhan of Persia, and other leading personages of the Mongol Empire, as well as to the Emperor of Ethiopia. He started on his journey in 1289, provided with letters to Arghun, to the Kublai, to Kaidu, Prince of the Tatars, to the King of Armenia and to the Patriarch of the Jacobites. His companions were the Dominican Nicholas of Pistoia and the merchant Peter of Lucalongo. He reached Tabriz (in Iranian Azerbeijan), then the chief city of Mongol Persia, if not of all Western Asia.

From Persia they moved down by sea to India, in 1291, to the Madras region or "Country of St Thomas" where he preached for thirteen months and baptized about one hundred persons; his companion Nicholas died. From there Montecorvino wrote home, in December 1291 (or 1292), the earliest noteworthy account of the Coromandel Coast furnished by any Western European. Travelling by sea from Nestorian Mailapur in Madras, he reached China in 1294, appearing in the capital "Cambaliech" or Khanbaliq (now Beijing), only to find that Kublai had just died, and Temür (Emperor Chengzong) had succeeded to the Yuan throne. Though the latter did apparently not embrace Christianity, he threw no obstacles in the way of the zealous missionary. Very soon, John won the confidence of the Yuan dynasty ruler in spite of the opposition of the Nestorians who had already settled there under the name of Jingjiao/Ching-chiao (景教).

In 1299 John built a church at Khanbaliq (now Beijing) and in 1305 a second church opposite the imperial palace, together with workshops and dwellings for two hundred persons. He gradually bought from the "heathen" parents about 150 boys, from 7 to 11 years of age, instructed them in Latin and Greek, wrote psalms and hymns for them and then trained them to serve Mass and sing in the choir. At the same time he familiarized himself with the native language, preached in it, and translated the New Testament and the Psalms into the Uyghur language that is used commonly by the ethnic Mongol ruling class of Yuan China. Among the 6,000 converts of John of Montecorvino was the Nestorian Ongut prince George, allegedly a descendant of Prester John, and a vassal of the great khan, mentioned by Marco Polo.

John wrote letters on 8 January 1305 and 13 February 1306, describing the progress of the Latin mission in the Far East, in spite of Nestorian opposition; alluding to the Latin Catholic community he had founded in India, and to an appeal he had received to preach in "Ethiopia" and dealing with overland and oversea routes to "Cathay", from the Black Sea and the Persian Gulf respectively.

After he had worked alone for eleven years, the German Franciscan Arnold of Cologne was sent to him (1304 or 1303) as his first colleague. In 1307 Pope Clement V, highly pleased with the missionary's success, sent seven Franciscan bishops (Andrew of Perugia, Andreuccio d'Assisi, Gerardo Albuini, Nicola da Banzia, Ulrico von Seyfriedsdorf, Peregrino da Castello, Guglielmo da Villanova) who were commissioned to consecrate John of Montecorvino archbishop of Peking and summus archiepiscopus 'chief archbishop' of all those countries; they were themselves to be his suffragan bishops. Only three of these envoys arrived safely: Gerardus, Peregrinus and Andrew of Perugia (1308). They consecrated John in 1308 and succeeded each other in the episcopal see of Zaiton (Quanzhou), which John had established. In 1312 three more Franciscans were sent out from Rome to act as suffragans, of whom one at least reached East Asia.

For the next 20 years the Chinese-Mongol mission continued to flourish under his leadership. A Franciscan tradition states that about 1310 John of Montecorvino converted the third Yuan monarch Külüg Khan, (Emperor Wuzong) but this is disputed. His mission unquestionably won remarkable successes in northern and eastern China. Besides three mission stations in Peking, he established one near Amoy harbour, opposite of Formosa island (present-day Taiwan).

John of Montecorvino translated the New Testament into Uyghur and provided copies of the Psalms, the Breviary and liturgical hymns for the Öngüt. He was instrumental in teaching boys the Latin chant, probably for a choir in the liturgy and with the hope that some of them might become priests. Also, he converted Armenians in China and Alans to Latin Catholicism in China.

Death 
John of Montecorvino died about 1328 in Peking. He was apparently the only effective European bishop during the medieval period in Peking. Even after his death, the mission in China endured for the next 40 years.

Legacy
Toghun Temür, the last Mongol (Yuan dynasty) emperor of China, sent an embassy to the French Pope Benedict XII in Avignon, in 1336. The embassy was led by a Genoese in the service of the Mongol emperor, Andrea di Nascio, and accompanied by another Genoese, Andalò di Savignone. These letters from the Mongol ruler represented that they had been eight years (since Montecorvino's death) without a spiritual guide, and earnestly desired one. The pope replied to the letters, and appointed four ecclesiastics as his legates to the khan's court. In 1338, a total of 50 ecclesiastics were sent by the Pope to Peking, among them John of Marignolli. In 1353 John returned to Avignon, and delivered a letter from the great khan to Pope Innocent VI. Soon, the Chinese rose up and drove the Mongols from China, thereby establishing the Ming Dynasty (1368). By 1369, all Christians, whether Latin Catholic or Syro-Oriental, were expelled by the Ming rulers.

Six centuries later, Montecorvino acted as the inspiration for another Franciscan, the Blessed Gabriele Allegra to go to China and complete the first translation of the Catholic Bible into Chinese in 1968.

See also
 Chronology of European exploration of Asia

 Odoric of Pordenone
 Rabban Bar Sauma
Prester John
Religion in China
 Christianity in China
 Roman Catholicism in China

References

Bibliography
 Jackson, Peter (2005). The Mongols and the West: 1221-1410. Longman. .

Further reading
 Pacifico Sella, Il Vangelo in Oriente. Giovanni da Montecorvino, frate minore e primo vescovo in terra di Cina (1247-1328), Assisi: Edizioni Porziuncola, 2008
The manuscripts of Montecorvino's Letters exist in the Laurentian Library, Florence (for the Indian Epistle) and in the National Library, Paris, 5006 Lat.-viz. the Liber de aetatibus, fols. 170, v.-172, r. (for the Chinese). They are printed in Wadding, Annales minorum (A.D. 1305 and 1306) vi. 69–72, 91-92 (ed. of 1733, &c.), and in the Münchner gelehrte Anzeigen (1855), No. 22, part in. pp. 171175. English translations, with valuable comments, are in Sir H. Yule's Cathay, i. 197–221.
See also Wadding, Annales, v. 195–198, 199–203, vi. 93, &c., 147, &c., 176, &c., 467, &c.; C. R. Beazley, Dawn of Modern Geography, iii. 162–178, 206–210; Sir H. Yule, Cathay, i. 165–173. (C. R. B.)
 Sir Henry Yule (ed.) Cathay and the Way Thither, London: Hakluyt Society, 1914, Vol. III, pp. 45-58. Contains two letters by Montecorvino.

External links
 Medieval Sourcebook: John of Monte Corvino: Report from China 1305.

1247 births
1328 deaths
People from the Province of Salerno
Italian Friars Minor
Franciscan bishops
14th-century Roman Catholic archbishops in China
Franciscan missionaries
Italian Roman Catholic missionaries
Diplomats of the Holy See
Roman Catholic missionaries in China
Roman Catholic missionaries in India
Italian emigrants to China
Italian expatriates in India